is a steel roller coaster located at Universal Studios Japan. Designed by Bolliger & Mabillard, it features inbuilt sound systems allowing riders to choose their ride music.

History
In July 2006, Universal Studios Japan announced a 2007 proposed installation of a new roller coaster. Although full details of the ride were not announced, officials stated that $50 million would be invested in the attraction. At the time this was the park's second-highest investment, following the $120 million The Amazing Adventures of Spider-Man ride. On 9 March 2007, after approximately eight months of construction, the park officially opened Hollywood Dream.

In 2009, Universal Studios Florida opened the roller coaster Hollywood Rip Ride Rockit. Although this ride was manufactured by Maurer Söhne, and featured a different track layout, it was inspired by Hollywood Dream. Both rides use on-board audio systems allowing rider-selection of music.

In 2013, Universal Studios Japan announced that from 15 March to 7 July they would be operating the ride with sections of the trains facing backwards, under the name Hollywood Dream – The Ride – Backdrop. As of December 2022, Backdrop is still an option in the park.

In 2022, Universal Studios Japan announced that the ride will be rethemed to One Piece. When the coaster reopens, it'll be retitled to ONE PIECE x Hollywood Dream – The Ride: Departure!, as part of One Piece Premier Show 2022.

Characteristics

Statistics
Hollywood Dream is a custom-built Bolliger & Mabillard Mega Coaster. The ride lasts two-and-a-half minutes and riders must be at least  in height to ride the attraction.

Trains
Each of Hollywood Dream's 5 trains carry 36 riders in nine cars, each having a row of four seats. All trains have an on-board audio and lighting system, with each seat having a headrest stereo sound system capable of playing one of five songs selected by the rider with a control panel inserted into the seat's restraining lap bar. The on-board audio and lighting system animates LED lights that are built into the trains' sides and front riderless pilot coach. The lighting program varies as the train moves, with different animations for different track sections and the station. The lighting pattern used for the park entrance track section gives the effect of a Comet with a sparkling head and glittering trail of light.

Musical selections
Riders can choose to play one of five tracks during the ride. At the time of the ride's launch these tracks included "Homebound Train" by Bon Jovi, "Lose Yourself" by Eminem, "Get Back" by The Beatles, "Osaka Lover" by Dreams Come True, and "The Wing Named You" by Kobukuro. They currently play songs such as "On Our Way" by The Royal Concept and "Can't Stop the Feeling!" by Justin Timberlake. As of December 2017, the English pop songs include "Live While We're Young" by One Direction and "Feel This Moment" by Pitbull and Christina Aguilera.

The ride's musical tracks changes over time.

Ride experience
Riders approach Hollywood Dream within the Hollywood area of Universal Studios Japan. Admission is through four entrance options: general admittance, holders of Universal Express Passes, single riders, and "child switch". Child switch is designed for children with adults, where one adult takes the ride while the other looks after a child, both then switching roles.

After being dispatched from the station the train ascends a  half-enclosed chain lift hill. As the train begins its descent, music of choice begins to play. The train turns to the right and then proceeds over the first of many camelback hills. This hill navigates over the roof structure covering the park's Hollywood area. A heavily banked turnaround is followed by another camelback over the roof. After a turn to the left the ride track runs parallel to the park's Hollywood street, after which the train navigates over two more camelback hills, and is slowed as it runs through a set of block brakes at the top of another hill. After descending out of the brakes, the train enters a one-and-a-half turn upward-spiralling helix followed by another camelback hill. A tunnel with strobe lighting leads the train into the final brake-run before it returns to the station.

Reception
In the first month after the ride's opening, Universal Studios Japan saw a rapid rise in attendance. This rise was directly attributed to Hollywood Dream and saw the company significantly increase their projections for profit for that financial year. The popularity of the ride eventually saw the park's net income increase by 63.6%.

In Mitch Hawker's worldwide Best Roller Coaster Poll, Hollywood Dream – The Ride peaked at position 69 in its debut year. The ride's ranking in subsequent polls is shown in the table below.

References

External links
 
 
 
 

Roller coasters in Japan
Roller coasters introduced in 2007
Roller coasters operated by Universal Parks & Resorts
Universal Studios Japan
Universal Parks & Resorts attractions by name
2007 establishments in Japan
Hypercoasters manufactured by Bolliger & Mabillard